Travis Taylor (born 22 February 1995) is a New Zealand rugby union player who currently plays for  in the Mitre 10 Cup. His position of choice is hooker.

Originally from Waipukurau, Taylor has captained the Manawatu U19s and been a part of the Manawatu development squad.

Taylor made his debut for the Manawatu senior squad in 2016. On 1 October 2016, in a 30–21 loss against Hawke's Bay, Taylor scored two tries.

References  

1995 births
Living people
Manawatu rugby union players
Rugby union hookers
People from Waipukurau
Rugby union players from the Hawke's Bay Region